The Awakening is an album by American jazz pianist Ahmad Jamal featuring performances recorded in 1970 for the Impulse! label.

Production
The album was recorded at Plaza Sound Studios in New York City on February 2 and 3, 1970. It was produced by Ed Michel, whose production credits also include jazz and blues artists such as John Lee Hooker, B.B. King, John Coltrane, and Alice Coltrane. The liner notes were written by jazz historian Leonard Feather.

Critical reception
The AllMusic review by Scott Yanow awarded the album 4 stars stating "By 1970, pianist Ahmad Jamal's style had changed a bit since the 1950s, becoming denser and more adventurous while still retaining his musical identity... Intriguing performances showing that Ahmad Jamal was continuing to evolve".

Writing in Pitchfork, Michael J. Agovino writes that the album "is a fine example of Jamal’s stately—and understated—elegance punctuated with doodles of whimsy".

Retrospectively, the album has had an influence in Hip hop music culture and production, with artists such as Nas and Common sampling tracks from the album for their work.

Track listing
 "The Awakening" (Ahmad Jamal) – 6:19
 "I Love Music" (Emil Boyd, Hale Smith) – 7:19
 "Patterns" (Ahmad Jamal) – 6:19
 "Dolphin Dance" (Herbie Hancock) – 5:05
 "You're My Everything" (Harry Warren, Joe Young, Mort Dixon) – 4:40
 "Stolen Moments" (Oliver Nelson) – 6:27
 "Wave" (Antônio Carlos Jobim) – 4:25

Personnel
Ahmad Jamal – piano
Jamil Nasser – bass
Frank Gant – drums

References 

Impulse! Records albums
Ahmad Jamal albums
1970 albums